Will Graulich (born 5 October 1992) is an English professional rugby union player who plays for Cornish Pirates. He was previously part of Gloucester Rugby academy.

On 7 May 2013, Will Graulich would sign for the Championship side Cornish Pirates for the 2013/14 season, effectively leaving Gloucester.

References

1992 births
Living people
Cornish Pirates players
English rugby union players
Gloucester Rugby players
Rugby union players from Worcester
Rugby union locks